Zone Pro Site (lit. "Bandoh master chef"), also known as Zone Pro Site: The Moveable Feast, is a 2013 Taiwanese comedy film directed by Chen Yu-hsun, starring Lin Mei-hsiu, Tony Yang and Kimi Hsia.

Plot 
Wan returns home to Tainan with an enormous debt after her modeling career in Taipei fails, only to find that her family's restaurant has been reduced to a single noodle stand. The situation is hopeless until a master chef decides to help her family return to glory.

Cast 
 Lin Mei-hsiu as Ai-fong, Master Fly Spirit's wife
 Tony Yang as Hai, a self-proclaimed food doctor who helps people improve the taste of their dishes
 Kimi Hsia as Wan, Master Fly Spirit's daughter
 Wu Nien-jen as Master Silly Mortal 
 Ko I-chen as Master Fly Spirit 
 Hsi Hsiang as Master Ghost Head
 Tuo Hsien as Master Tiger Nose
 Wu Pong-fong as Teacher of Master Tiger Nose
 Bamboo Chen as Debt collector A
 Chen Wan-hao as Debt collector B
 Rhydian Vaughan as Street musician 
 Ma Nien-hsien as Taxi driver

Soundtrack

Reception 
It was the 6th highest-grossing film of 2013 in Taiwan, with NT$305 million.

Film Business Asia's Derek Elley gave the film a rating of 8 out of 10.

Awards and nominations

References

External links 
 

2013 comedy films
2013 films
Taiwanese comedy films
2010s Mandarin-language films
Taiwanese-language films
Films set in Taipei
Films set in Tainan
Films shot in Tainan